Chiara Carbognin (born 1 December 1996) is an Italian female canoeist who won a gold medal in C1 sprint at individual senior level at the Wildwater Canoeing World Championships in 2014 at 18 years old.

References

External links
 

1996 births
Living people
Italian female canoeists